Sumba Strait  (Indonesian: Selat Sumba) is a strait in Indonesia.

It separates the island of Sumba from the major islands of Flores and Sumbawa, as well as minor islands including Komodo and Rinca. It connects the Indian Ocean to the Savu Sea. 

Prior to Indonesian independence it was known as Sandalwood Strait.
It is also known as the Savu Sea.

Notes

Straits of Indonesia
Landforms of Sumba
Landforms of East Nusa Tenggara
Landforms of Flores Island (Indonesia)
Landforms of Sumbawa